Bedi Bandavalu is a 1968 Indian Kannada-language film, directed by C. Srinivasan and produced by T. N. Srinivasan. The film stars Kalyan Kumar and Chandrakala in the lead roles. The film has musical score by R. Sudarshanam. The film is inspired by the 1847 novel Jane Eyre by Charlotte Bronte.It was remade in Tamil in 1969 as Shanti Nilayam.

Cast

Kalyan Kumar
Dwarakish as Ramakrishna
Ramen Rao
Rajaram Giriyan
Shyamsundar
Sahyadri
Master Gopal
Srirangamurthy
Lakshman Rao
Venkataram
Chandrakala
Shailashree
Kamalamma
Malathamma
Indrani
A. Lalitha
Radha
Rama
Kavitha
Baby Sunanda
Baby Roja Ramani
Baby Padmashree
Baby Prema
Baby Jayanthi
B. Jayamma in Guest Appearance
Ranga in Guest Appearance

Soundtrack
The music was composed by R. Sudarsanam.

References

External links
 

1968 films
1960s Kannada-language films
Kannada films remade in other languages
Films based on Jane Eyre
Films based on works by Charlotte Brontë
Films scored by R. Sudarsanam